Amy Farina is a musician living in Washington, D.C. As of 2001, Farina has played drums and sings in the Indie rock duo The Evens, which includes her husband, Ian MacKaye.

Career
Farina has played in The Warmers (which included Ian's younger brother Alec MacKaye), Mister Candy Eater, Ted Leo & the Pharmacists and with Lois Maffeo.

The Evens

Farina and Ian MacKaye formed The Evens in 2001. Farina sings and plays drums with MacKaye playing baritone guitar and sharing vocal duties. The Evens released their self-titled album in early 2005, breaking a three-year silence by MacKaye. Their second album, Get Evens, was released in November 2006. Their most recent album is called The Odds and was released November 20, 2012.

Coriky

In 2015, Farina and MacKaye began playing music with Joe Lally (Fugazi, The Messthetics). In 2018, the group played their first show, now with the adopted moniker Coriky. During early 2020, Coriky released two songs, "Clean Kill" and "Too Many Husbands", via various free streaming services. Although the self-titled album was originally set for release on March 27, 2020, the COVID-19 lockdown enacted during March 2020 delayed release until June 12, 2020.

Personal life
She and MacKaye have a child born in 2008.

She is the sister of Geoff Farina of the band Karate.

References

External links
The Evens official website

Living people
Year of birth missing (living people)
American women drummers
American women singers
American rock drummers
Singers from Washington, D.C.
Ted Leo and the Pharmacists members
The Evens members
The Warmers members
Coriky members
21st-century American women